Kishmish is a 2022 Indian Bengali-language romantic comedy film written and directed by Rahool Mukherjee. This film is jointly produced by Dev Entertainment Ventures and M. K. Media. The film stars Dev and Rukmini Maitra. The supporting cast includes Kharaj Mukherjee, Anjana Basu, June Malia and Kamaleshwar Mukherjee.

Plot 

After failing in the school examinations, Tintin goes to his college where he meets Rohini, a topper girl in his batch. Gradually they fell in love with each other. They both want to marry each other but somehow, they couldn't manage their parents. Then a series of events happen in their life which makes the situation more complex.

Cast 
 Dev as Krishanu Chatterjee aka Tintin
 Rukmini Maitra as Rohini Sen
 Kharaj Mukherjee as Govinda Goblu Chatterjee, Tintin's father
 Anjana Basu as Pubali Chatterjee, Tintin's mother
 Kamaleshwar Mukherjee as Ashim Sen, Rohini's father
 June Malia as Rohini's mother
 Lily Chakravarty as Buri, Pubali's aunt
 Paran Bandopadhyay (cameo appearance) 
 Ankush Hazra (cameo appearance)  
 Rituparna Sengupta (cameo appearance)  
 Jisshu Sengupta (cameo appearance)  
 Srabanti Chatterjee (cameo appearance)

Production

Development 
The film was announced in November 2020, starring Dev and Rukmini Maitra.

Filming 
The makers of the film with arranged an muhurat puja for the team a month ahead of filming. The principal photography of the film started in August 2021 in Kolkata, followed by Darjeeling, and was completed within 10 days. The film was wrapped up on 22 September 2021.

Soundtrack 
The film's music composed and lyrics written by Nilayan Chatterjee. On 30 March 2022, the first song titled "Tui Bolbo Na Tumi"  sung by Nikhita Gandhi and Subhadeep Pan was unveiled. Ten days later, the second song "Oboseshe" sung by Arijit Singh was released.

Release 
The film was released theatrically on 29 April 2022.

Reception 
Upam Buzarbaruah of The Times of India gave it three and a half stars out of five and praised the movie saying that it is quite a pleasant watch. He noted that runtime of almost two and a half hours is a bit lengthy but the narrative, interspersed with some nice melodious songs, moves at a relatively fast pace and helps in passing the time easily. He opined that Kishmish is a refreshing treat for all ages and for the family.

Anandabazar Patrika reviewed that the film brings back the nostalgic memories of college days and that watching it would lead one to possess a desire to go back to college. The protagonist of the film, Dev, expressed that the best review was received from his father. He wrote "In my 39 years of life, my dad never wrote me a letter. Like every other movie, my dad and my family came today to see the movie Kishmish. Outside Dad wrote "Kishmish Super duper Hit"." Ei Samay reviewed it and gave it three and a half stars out of five.

References

External links 
 

2022 films
2022 romantic comedy films
Bengali-language Indian films
Indian romantic comedy films
2020s Bengali-language films